Rutherford Township may refer to:

 Rutherford Township, now part of Killarney, Ontario, Canada
 Rutherford Township, Martin County, Indiana, United States

Township name disambiguation pages